An RV is a recreational vehicle, a motorhome.

RV or Rv may also refer to:

Arts, entertainment, and media
 RV (film), a 2006 comedy film starring Robin Williams
 RV (rapper), a British rapper from London
Radio Vaticana (Vatican Radio), the official broadcasting service of the Vatican
 Re-Volt, a radio controlled car race game
 Red Velvet, a South Korean girl group
 Roma Victor, an online role-playing game based on the Roman Empire in the latter half of the 2nd century
 Ryom-Verzeichnis, a partial catalog of the music of Antonio Vivaldi, created by Peter Ryom

Organisations
 R. V. College of Engineering, located in Bangalore, India
 Red Electoral Alliance (Rød Valgallianse or Raud Valallianse), a former political party in Norway

Places
 Revenue Village, a type of small administrative region in India
 Rift Valley Province, in Kenya
 Rožňava, Slovakia (car plate registration identifier RV)

Science, technology, and mathematics
 Random variable, in probability and statistics
 Radial velocity, the velocity of an object in the direction of the line of sight
 RealVideo, a video format developed by RealNetworks
 Residual volume, the volume of air remaining in the respiratory system after maximal expiration; see lung volumes
 Rotational velocity, an angular speed
 Variable resistor, an abbreviation used in electronic circuit schematics
 Rotavirus, the most common cause of diarrhoeal disease among infants and young children
 RISC-V, an open standard instruction set architecture

Transport

Vehicles
 RV, or recreational vehicle
 Re-entry vehicle, a space vehicle intended to enter an atmosphere
 Research vessel, a ship primarily constructed to carry out scientific research at sea

Other uses in transport
 Air Canada Rouge, a wholly owned subsidiary of Air Canada, by IATA airline code
 Norwegian national road, used for labeling routes in Norway
 Rahway Valley Railroad, a railroad in the United States
 Van's Aircraft, an American manufacturer of kit aircraft

Other uses
 Registered voters, in political polls
Relative value (economics), a measure of corporate financial health relative to other companies
 Remote viewing, a paranormal ability
 Revised Version, a Bible edition
 Rigveda, first sacred canonical text of Hinduism

See also
 R5 (disambiguation)
 Rendezvous (disambiguation), the anglicisation of the French word rendez-vous, meaning "appointment", is sometimes abbreviated as rv